Bermann may refer to:

Evelyne Bermann (born 1950), Swiss-born Liechtenstein artist 
George Bermann (born 1945), American lawyer and scholar of international law
Gregorio Bermann (1894–1972), Argentine psychiatrist, philosopher, activist, author, and humanist
Herb Bermann, American lyricist, screenwriter, and actor
Sandra Bermann, American literary scholar
Sylvie Bermann (born 1953), French career diplomat
Gottfried Bermann Fischer (1897–1995), German publisher